Rajie Cook (July 6, 1930 – February 6, 2021), also known as Roger Cook, was an American graphic designer, artist, Palestinian peace activist, humanitarian and photographer.

Cook was born in Newark, New Jersey, in 1930, into a Palestinian-Christian family. He was president of Cook and Shanosky Associates, a graphic design firm he founded in 1967. The firm produced all forms of corporate communications including: Corporate Identity, Advertising, Signage, Annual Reports and Brochures.

His graphic design and photography have been used by IBM, Container Corporation of America, Montgomery Ward, Bristol Myers Squibb, Black & Decker, Volvo, Subaru, AT&T, New York Times, Bell Atlantic, BASF, Lenox, and a number of other major international corporations.

He received the Presidential Award for Design Excellence from president Ronald Reagan and Elizabeth Dole on January 30, 1984 in the Indian Treaty Room of the Old Executive Office Building in Washington, DC. Juries under the auspices of the National Endowments chose the thirteen winners of the Federal Design Achievement Awards for the Arts.

In 2003, Symbols Signs a project designed by his firm for the US Department of Transportation was accepted by the Acquisitions Committee to the collections of Cooper-Hewitt, National Design Museum, and The Smithsonian Institution.

Cook was a graduate of the Pratt Institute and in 1997 was selected as Alumni of the year, and has also served on the Pratt Advisory Board. He has been a member of the American Institute of Graphic Arts. He died in Newtown, Pennsylvania, on February 6, 2021.

Sculptural assemblages 

Inspired in part by the work of Joseph Cornell, Cook has turned to sculptural assemblage.

Many of the “Boxes” that he has created are an expression of the artist’s deeply felt concern for human rights and for the tragic conditions in the Middle East. They were created to articulate the circumstances and experiences he encountered during the ten years he has served on the Task Force for the Middle East, a group sponsored by the Presbyterian Church (USA). With this group he has traveled on fact-finding trips to Israel, Jordan, and Palestine (West Bank and Gaza).

Personal life 

After an elementary school teacher told Rajie that his name was too difficult to pronounce, Rajie became known as Roger, a name he was referred to until he re-embraced Rajie in his older years. The name Cook, too, had been externally changed. Rajie's family name was Suleiman, and was first changed by the Turkish and then by the British. 

Rajie met his wife of 65 years, Margit "Peggy" Schneider, in 1944. She was, as he wrote, "a woman of intelligence and integrity, the kind of life companion who would explore this path I wanted to follow with me." Rajie and Peggy devoted their lives to their love of modern design; in 1969 they moved with their daughters Cyndi and Cathie to a Bauhaus-inspired glass and stone home they built in the woods of Washington Crossing, Pennsylvania. Rajie was an avid tennis player, a brave bee keeper, and accomplished bluegrass musician.

In addition to his daughters and wife, Rajie had one son-in-law, Will Rhodin; three grandchildren, Sara (Tyler Lechtenberg), Torin, and Amy Rhodin; and two great grandchildren, Solomon Rajie and Petra Najla Lechtenberg.

References

External links 
 Roger's Website featuring more of his box assemblies.
 DOT pictograms (symbol signs)
 Airport, an animated film made from AIGA pictograms
  Narrative, expression of identity in transition, Al-Bustan Seeds of Culture project.

1930 births
2021 deaths
American graphic designers
American photographers
American people of Palestinian descent
Pratt Institute alumni